Bossiaea milesiae is a species of flowering plant in the family Fabaceae and is endemic to a restricted area of New South Wales. It is an erect shrub with flattened, winged cladodes, small, scale-like leaves, and pea-like yellow to apricot-coloured and red flowers.

Description
There are also bracteoles that fall off before the flower opens.

Taxonomy and naming
Bossiaea milesiae was first formally described in 2009 by Keith Leonard McDougall in the journal Telopea from specimens he collected near Brogo Dam in 2006. The specific epithet (milesiae) honours the botanist Jackie Miles.

Distribution and habitat
This bossiaea grows in forest and woodland, sometimes in river beds, mostly in and near Wadbilliga National Park in south-eastern New South Wales.

References

milesiae
Flora of New South Wales
Plants described in 2009